John Acquroff (9 September 1911 – 1987) was a footballer who played in the Football League for Bury, Hull City and Norwich City.

References

1911 births
1987 deaths
English footballers
Tottenham Hotspur F.C. players
Northfleet United F.C. players
Folkestone F.C. players
Hull City A.F.C. players
Bury F.C. players
Norwich City F.C. players
English Football League players
Association football forwards